Sparta Rotterdam in European Football includes the games which are played by Sparta Rotterdam in competitions organized by UEFA.

Totals

Top scorers

Competitions by Countries

Most Played Teams

Results

(1951–1960)

1959-60 season

4–4 on aggregate.

Sparta Rotterdam won the play-off 3–1.

3–3 on aggregate.

Rangers won the play-off 3–2.

(1961–1970)

1961-62 season

1962-63 season

Lausanne won 5-4 on aggregate.

1963-64 season

1965-66 season

1966-67 season

Sparta Rotterdam won 7–1 on aggregate.

Servette won 2–1 on aggregate.

1967-68 season

1970-71 season

Sparta Rotterdam won 15–0 on aggregate.

Sparta Rotterdam won 4–1 on aggregate.

Bayern Munich won 5–2 on aggregate.

(1971–1980)

1971-72 season

Sparta won 3–1 on aggregate.

Red Star won 3–2 on aggregate.

1975-76 season

(1981–1990)

1983-84 season

Sparta Rotterdam won 5–1 on aggregate.

Sparta Rotterdam won 4–3 on aggregate.

Spartak Moscow won 3–1 on aggregate.

1985-86 season

2–2 on aggregate; Sparta Rotterdam won on 4-3 penalties.

Borussia Mönchengladbach won 6–2 on aggregate.

(1991–2000)

1994-95 season

Notes

References

Dutch football clubs in international competitions
Sparta Rotterdam

External links
 Sparta Rotterdam in Champions League
 Official web site of Sparta Rotterdam